"Girls Talk" is a new wave song written by Elvis Costello and first recorded by Dave Edmunds in 1978.

Costello gave an early version of the song to Edmunds, who reworked the song and released it on his album Repeat When Necessary. Edmunds' version peaked at number four on the UK Singles Chart and number 12 in Ireland. Costello later released his version of the song as a B-side to his version of "I Can't Stand Up for Falling Down."

Background
As with many of Costello's previous songs, it is tricky to ascertain a particular meaning, as his lyrics are replete with such double meanings as "though you may not be an old-fashioned girl, you're still going to get dated". In the liner notes for the 2002 Rhino reissue of Get Happy!!, Costello stated that the record was about women's gossip.

The most successful cover version of the song was by Dave Edmunds, to whom Costello says he donated the song "in a moment of drunken bravado." Edmunds said, "Elvis came to the studio one day, and he said, 'I've got a song for you.' And he gave me a cassette. Now, it wasn't very good - it was just him on a guitar, and he was rushing through it at a furious pace. At first I couldn't see it. I really liked the complete new arrangement and feel that I put to it. I'm not sure Elvis liked it, mind you. He's quite an intense person and he's quick to point out things that he doesn't like."

Released in June 1979, Edmunds' version charted at #4 on the UK Singles Chart, spending 11 weeks on the chart. It was his final top ten hit in that country, and began his album Repeat When Necessary.

Costello recorded a version which was released as the B-side of his single "I Can't Stand Up for Falling Down", and was a fixture of the set lists for his tours for some time after it was recorded.

Linda Ronstadt also recorded a version of "Girls Talk" fashioned after the Dave Edmunds version, for her album "Mad Love" which contained three songs composed by Elvis Costello. It was released in 1980.

Music video
A music video was produced for the song. It features Edmunds and Rockpile playing on the roof of the Warner Brothers Records building in Midtown Manhattan as well as assorted shots of people walking through Manhattan.

Critical reception
Stewart Mason of AllMusic gave the song a positive review restrospectively, complimenting the tone of "suppressed menace", and saying that "it features some of his sharpest lyrics of the era". In addition, Debra Rae Cohen of Rolling Stone said that although Edmunds' version was "cocky [and] rowdy", "Costello restores the tune's paranoiac underpinnings with the nervous quaver of his voice and soft keyboard parts that echo like footfalls".

Chart history

Weekly charts

Year-end charts

References

1979 songs
Dave Edmunds songs
Swan Song Records singles
Songs written by Elvis Costello
Elvis Costello songs
1979 singles